Angel Romero (born August 17, 1956 in Málaga) is a Spanish classical guitarist, conductor and former member of the guitar quartet Los Romeros. He is the youngest son of Celedonio Romero, who in 1957 left Spain for the United States with his family.

Romero made his professional debut at the age of six.  At the age of sixteen, at his United States debut, he appeared as the Los Angeles Philharmonic's first guitar soloist, giving Joaquín Rodrigo's  Concierto de Aranjuez its premiere for the US West Coast. He has studied conducting with Eugene Ormandy, the conductor of the Philadelphia Orchestra.

He has performed as a soloist with orchestras including the New York Philharmonic, the Cleveland Orchestra, the Royal Philharmonic, the New World Symphony, and the Royal Concertgebouw Orchestra. He has also conducted the Pittsburgh Symphony, the Academy of St Martin in the Fields, the Royal Philharmonic, Germany’s NDR Symphony Orchestra and the Berlin Symphoniker, the Beijing Philharmonic, the Euro-Asia Philharmonic, the Shanghai Symphony, the Bogotá Philharmonic, the Chicago Sinfonietta, the Orquesta de Baja California, the Santa Barbara Symphony, the San Diego Symphony and the San Diego Chamber Orchestra, among others. He has made highly acclaimed recordings for Delos International, RCA Victor Red Seal and RCA Victor Worldwide, Telarc and Angel/EMI (Angel/EMI recordings produced by Patti Laursen).

On February 11, 2000 at the USC Thornton School of Music, he and his brothers, Pepe and Celin, were each presented with the Grand Cross of Isabel la Catolica (the highest honour that can be offered in Spain), and were knighted for their musical accomplishments; the ceremony included a gala performance by The Romeros and the Thornton Chamber Orchestra.

In 2007, he was honoured by the Recording Academy, producer of the Grammy Awards, with the Recording Academy President’s Merit Award.

He has also been involved in the film industry. In 1989, he performed the score for The Milagro Beanfield War, directed by Robert Redford. In 1994, he composed and directed the musical score for Bienvenido-Welcome, a film by Gabriele Retes, for which he won the 1995 ARIEL (the "Academy Award" of Mexico). He also performed and recorded the score for By the Sword composed by Bill Conti, and played a cameo role in Bound by Honor, a Taylor Hackford film.

Discography 

 Concierto de Aranjuez and Fantasia para un Gentilhombre
 A Touch of Class: Popular Classics Transcribed for Guitar
 A Touch of Romance: Spanish & Latin Favorites Transcribed for Guitar
 Angel Romero Plays Bach: The Music of Bach Transcribed for Guitar
 Granados: Twelve Spanish Dances 
 Vivaldi Concertos with the Academy of St Martin in the Fields 
 Remembering the Future
 Romero/Rodrigo – Solo works for guitar
 Bella: The Incomparable Artistry of Angel Romero

Bibliography 

 Bella: The Incomparable Artistry of Angel Romero” instructional book

Videography 

 Angel Romero: The Art of Classical Guitar DVD
 Angel Romero, Virtuoso DVD

Premieres

See also 
The Romero Guitar Quartet 
 1960–90: Celedonio Romero, Celin Romero, Pepe Romero, Angel Romero
 1990–96: Celedonio Romero, Celin Romero, Pepe Romero, Celino Romero
 since 1996: Celin Romero, Pepe Romero, Celino Romero, Lito Romero

External links
Official website
Some photos of LP covers (Oviatt Library Digital Collections)
Angel Romero interview by Bruce Duffie

References

1946 births
Living people
Spanish classical guitarists
People from Málaga
Spanish male guitarists
Musicians awarded knighthoods